Podgrad means 'below the castle' in Slovene. There are several small settlements or villages named Podgrad in Slovenia.
Podgrad, Gornja Radgona, a village in the Municipality of Gornja Radgona, northeastern Slovenia
Podgrad, Ilirska Bistrica, a village in the Municipality of Ilirska Bistrica, southwestern Slovenia
Podgrad, Ljubljana, a village in the City Municipality of Ljubljana, central Slovenia
Podgrad, Novo Mesto, a village in the City Municipality of Novo Mesto, southeastern Slovenia
Podgrad na Pohorju, a village in the Municipality of Slovenska Bistrica, northeastern Slovenia
Podgrad, Šentjur, a village in the Municipality of Šentjur, eastern Slovenia
Podgrad pri Vremah, a settlement in Municipality of Divača, southwestern Slovenia

See also 
Podgora (disambiguation)